Gobius koseirensis is a species of goby native to the western Indian Ocean where it is only known to occur off the coast of Egypt.

References

Fish described in 1871
Fish of the Red Sea
Fish of Africa
koseirensis
Taxa named by Carl Benjamin Klunzinger